The 1983 Hamilton Tiger-Cats season was the 26th season for the team in the Canadian Football League and their 35th overall. The Tiger-Cats finished in 3rd place in the East Division with a 5–10–1 record. They defeated the Ottawa Rough Riders in the East Semi-Final, but lost to the eventual Grey Cup champion Toronto Argonauts in the East Final.

Preseason

Regular season

Season Standings

Season schedule

Postseason

Schedule

Awards and honours

1983 CFL All-Stars
Johnny Shepherd, Running back

References

Hamilton Tiger-cats Season, 1983
Hamilton Tiger-Cats seasons
1983 Canadian Football League season by team